Curtis Knight (May 9, 1929November 29, 1999), born Mont Curtis McNear, was an American musician who is known for his association with Jimi Hendrix.

Knight was a singer in the 1960s Harlem R&B music scene, usually fronting his own band, the Squires. In 1965, with Hendrix as guitarist, he recorded some singles and demos for record producer Ed Chalpin.  Chalpin also signed Hendrix to a management contract, which Hendrix soon forgot about and left for England in 1966 to form the Jimi Hendrix Experience. After Hendrix became famous, Knight and Chalpin issued hundreds of albums of the recordings with Hendrix, resulting in years of legal action by both sides.

During the 1970s, after Hendrix's demise, Knight moved to London, where he formed the group "Curtis Knight, Zeus", and toured throughout Europe, relying on his Hendrix connection for many years.   Among the musicians enlisted was Fast Eddie Clarke, who later joined Motörhead.

In 1974, Knight authored a biography Jimi: An Intimate Biography of Jimi Hendrix.  He also wrote a second book on Hendrix, titled Starchild, published in the mid-1990s. In 1992, Knight relocated to the Netherlands where he continued to record up to his death from cancer in November 1999.

Family background
Knight is related to singer Barbara McNair who is reportedly his cousin.

Partial discography
In 2003, Hendrix's estate finally prevailed in their legal actions against Chalpin and gained control of all of Hendrix's recordings associated with Knight, Chalpin, and PPX.  Experience Hendrix, which currently manages Hendrix's recording legacy, has begun releasing the material he recorded with Knight. Much of it has been sonically restored and removes later overdubs and electronic effects.

Singles
"Voodoo Woman" / "That's Why"Curtis Knight (1961, Gulf)
"You're Gonna Be Sorry" /  "Little Doe-Doe"Curtis Knight (1962, Shell)
"Ain't Gonna Be No Next Time" / "More Love"Curtis Knight (1965, RSVP)
"How Would You Feel" / "Welcome Home"Curtis Knight (1965, RSVP)
"Hornet's Nest" / "Knock Yourself Out"Curtis Knight and the Squires (1966, RSVP)
"You Don't Want Me" / "How Would You Feel"Curtis Knight and Jimi Hendrix (1967, Track Records)
"Hush Now" / "Flashing"Jimi Hendrix and Curtis Knight (1967, London Records)
"Day Tripper" / "Love, Love"Jimi Hendrix and Curtis Knight (1967, London Records)
"Ballad of Jimi" / "Gloomy Monday"Curtis Knight and Jimi Hendrix (1970, London Records)
Albums
Get That Feeling"Jimi Hendrix Plays and Curtis Knight Sings" (1967, Capitol Records)
Flashing"Jimi Hendrix Plays and Curtis Knight Sings" (1968, Capitol Records)
Love, Peace & Freedom (1972, Decca)
You Can't Use My Name: The RSVP/PPX SessionsCurtis Knight and the Squires (2015, Legacy Recordings)
Live at George’s Club 20 1965 & 1966Curtis Knight Featuring Jimi Hendrix (2017, Dagger Records)
No Business - The PPX Sessions Volume 2Curtis Knight and the Squires (2020, Dagger Records)

Notes
Citations

References

External links

1929 births
1999 deaths
People from Fort Scott, Kansas
American male musicians
Jimi Hendrix
20th-century American musicians
Musicians from London
20th-century male musicians